Doña Joaquina Téllez-Girón y Pimentel, 2nd Countess of Osilo, iure uxoris Marchioness of Santa Cruz (Spanish: Doña Joaquina Téllez-Girón, marquesa de Santa Cruz; 21 September 1784 – 17 November 1851) was a daughter of Pedro Téllez-Girón, 9th Duke of Osuna and María Josefa Pimentel, 12th Countess-Duchess of Benavente.

In 1801, she married José Gabriel de Silva-Bazán y Waldstein, the future Marquess of Santa Cruz.

She is best known as the subject of an 1805 portrait by Francisco José de Goya y Lucientes, a family friend.

References

Sources
Antonio Marichalar, Riesgo y ventura del duque de Osuna Escrito

1784 births
1851 deaths
Marquesses of Spain
Joaquina
Grandees of Spain
Joaquina
Spanish salon-holders